The Château de La Clayette is a 14th- and 19th-century castle in the French town of La Clayette, situated in south-western Burgundy, in the north of the historical province of Beaujolais. It is a listed historical monument.

Description
Originally, the castle was built as a fortress because of its strategic defensive location, surrounded by a water-filled moat.

It is private property and not open to the public.

History
1307: Earliest mention as a fortified house.
1380: During the Hundred Years' War, Philibert de Lespinasse turned the fortified house into a castle.
1420: The castle belonged to Louis de Chantemerle.
1524: Francis I of France spent a night in the castle on his way to Lyon.
1632: The castle belonged to Paul of the House of Damas, one of France's oldest noble families.
1703: By inheritance, the castle went to the Dyo family after the death of Jean-Léonard de Damas.
1722: Bernard de Noblet bought the castle, whose descendants are still owners.

It was expanded to its current size in the 19th century.

Gallery

See also 
 List of castles in France

References

Châteaux in Saône-et-Loire
Castles in Bourgogne-Franche-Comté
House of Damas
Bourgogne-Franche-Comté
Saône-et-Loire